The women's freestyle 51 kilograms is a competition featured at the 2001 World Wrestling Championships, and was held at the Winter Sports Palace in Sofia, Bulgaria from 23 to 25 November 2001.

Results
Legend
F — Won by fall

Preliminary round

Pool 1

Pool 2

Pool 3

Pool 4

Pool 5

Pool 6

Knockout round

References

Women's freestyle 51 kg